Ina Millman is a South African artist and a well established art teacher based in Johannesburg, South Africa. She paints in many different styles, including watercolours, oils, acrylics and pastels. Ina’s work can be viewed at exclusive galleries in South Africa. She has also exhibited as far afield as the Del Bello Gallery in Toronto, Canada and her paintings are on display in Australia, New Zealand, Germany, USA and the United Kingdom.

History 
Ina Millman was born in Johannesburg and attended Mondeor Primary, Fakkel Hoërskool and earned a BA degree at the Potchefstroom University for Christian Higher Education in 1974.

Whilst teaching at St. John Bosco College and later at the Hill High, she attended every workshop and Art Week possible. She further studied art at the Johannesburg College of Education under Glynnis Jepp and Dorothy Momberg.

She was appointed organizer of an annual art exhibition/fund raiser at St. Martin’s Prep School for a number of years, coordinating up to 20 exhibiting artists at each function.

Whilst still teaching, she studied and practiced pottery under Master Potter Anneli Jarm for 7 years.

Exhibitions 
1986 to 1988 saw her first exhibitions in Walkerville where she sold both paintings and pottery attracting a number of awards, at the annual show, for her paintings.

She also participated in numerous group exhibitions with the Watercolour Society and Brush and Chisel Club at exhibitions at Norscot Manner, Rosebank and Bryanston.

She had a successful exhibition at the Coetzee Roux Gallery in Melville in August 2000.

Hard work lead to her first solo exhibition held at Yapanis Gallery in July 2006, where she exhibited 70 paintings. An estimated 300 people were entertained by the late Patrick Mynhardt at the opening and 9 paintings were sold during the course of the evening. 15 more were sold during the next two weeks.

References

External links 

South African painters
Year of birth missing (living people)
Living people